Jean-Benoît Gonda is a Central African politician. He served in the Pan-African Parliament representing Central African Republic and in the National Assembly as apart of the National Party for a New Central Africa.

References

Central African Republic politicians